Trypoxylini is a tribe of traditional Sphecidae in the family Crabronidae. There are at least 840 described species in Trypoxylini.

Genera
These nine genera belong to the tribe Trypoxylini:
 Aulacophilinus Lomholdt, 1980
 Aulacophilus F. Smith, 1869
 Entomopison Menke, 1968
 Pison Jurine in Spinola, 1808
 Pisonopsis W. Fox, 1893
 Pisoxylon Menke, 1968
 Trypoxylon Latreille, 1796
 † Eopison Nel, 2005
 † Megapison Zhang, 1989

References

External links

 NCBI Taxonomy Browser, Trypoxylini

Crabronidae